The Jamaica Urban Transit Company (JUTC) is the government owned public transport service operating within the Kingston Metropolitan Transport Region (KMTR), Spanish Town and Portmore.

The company is headquartered in Spanish Town with its primary hubs being: Half Way Tree Transport Centre (in Half Way Tree, Saint Andrew); North, West and South Parades (NWS Parades) in Downtown, Kingston; and the Spanish Town Bus Terminal. Other main terminals/areas utilised by the JUTC include: Papine, New Kingston, Cross Roads, Portmore Downtown and Spanish Town.

The Jamaica Urban Transit Company now has a fleet of approximately 400 buses. The buses are yellow in colour with the Jamaican flag on the front of the bus. The older fleets are white in colour and are currently being phased out. The buses had drivers and conductors to collect fare; however, with the new fleet in 2009, the roles of conductor was merged with that of driver. The buses now have automatic fare collection machines as of 2013, with the intention to implement a cash-less system. The JUTC also compete with the private owned route buses and taxis; which operates on sub-franchised routes provided by the company. Legally, the JUTC is the only provider of transit services in the KMTR.

Operations

The Jamaica Urban Transit Company operates more than 70 routes across the Kingston, Portmore and Spanish Town. Routes also travel to Clarendon and sub-suburban Saint Catherine. The company launched an Express Service operating on a different schedule and different fare structure.

Fares

Regular and Shuttle Services

Express and Premium Services

Routes

The Jamaica Urban Transit Company operates three bus systems: Regular, Shuttles and Express.

Regular Routes

Shuttle Routes

Express Routes

Premium Routes

See also
 Transport in Jamaica

References

Transport in Jamaica